In enzymology, a homoserine O-acetyltransferase is an enzyme that catalyzes the chemical reaction

acetyl-CoA + L-homoserine  CoA + O-acetyl-L-homoserine

Thus, the two substrates of this enzyme are acetyl-CoA and L-homoserine, whereas its two products are CoA and O-acetyl-L-homoserine.

This enzyme belongs to the family of transferases, specifically those acyltransferases transferring groups other than aminoacyl groups.  The systematic name of this enzyme class is acetyl-CoA:L-homoserine O-acetyltransferase. Other names in common use include homoserine acetyltransferase, homoserine transacetylase, homoserine-O-transacetylase, and L-homoserine O-acetyltransferase.  This enzyme participates in methionine metabolism and sulfur metabolism.

Structural studies

As of late 2007, only one structure has been solved for this class of enzymes, with the PDB accession code .

References

 

EC 2.3.1
Enzymes of known structure